William Loudon Black (21 December 1929 – 8 January 2015) was a Scottish football forward who played in the Scottish League for Queen's Park. He was capped by Scotland at amateur level.

References

Scottish footballers
Scottish Football League players
Queen's Park F.C. players
Association football forwards
Scotland amateur international footballers
1929 births
2015 deaths
People from Largs